The Thorns is the only studio album by rock supergroup The Thorns.  Released by Aware Records in 2003, it was produced by Brendan O'Brien following songwriting sessions by the three members (Matthew Sweet, Pete Droge and Shawn Mullins) before they officially became a band.

Track listing
All songs written by Shawn Mullins, Matthew Sweet and Pete Droge unless otherwise noted.
"Runaway Feeling" – 3:28
"I Can't Remember" – 3:31
"Blue" (Mark Olson, Gary Louris) – 2:53
"Think It Over" – 3:26
"Thorns" – 2:56
"No Blue Sky" (Mullins, Droge, Marshall Altman, Glen Phillips) – 4:38
"Now I Know" (Sweet) – 1:56
"Dragonfly" – 3:06
"Long, Sweet Summer Night" – 3:12
"I Told You" – 3:07
"Such a Shame" – 3:36
"I Set the World on Fire" – 3:04
"Among the Living" – 4:08

Personnel
Matthew Sweet – vocals, bass, acoustic and electric guitar, vihuela, baritone ukulele, marxophone, keyboards, percussion
Shawn Mullins – vocals, acoustic and electric guitars, vihuela, keyboards, percussion, dulcimer
Pete Droge – vocals, acoustic, electric and baritone guitar, ukelin, keyboards, cymbals
Jim Keltner – drums
Greg Leisz – mandola, mandolin, pedal steel, lap steel and 12-string electric guitar, electric dulcimer
Brendan O'Brien – acoustic and electric guitar, bass, hurdy-gurdy, marxophone, bass harmonica, keyboards, percussion
Roy Bittan – piano, electric piano

References

2003 debut albums
Albums produced by Brendan O'Brien (record producer)
Aware Records albums
The Thorns albums